Disney XD was a children's channel that broadcast 16 hours a day, between 6:00 and 22:00 CET. It replaced Jetix and Toon Disney on September 12, 2009. Jetix used to end its broadcast daily at 6:00 PM. Disney XD was funded by advertising, as was Jetix, while Toon Disney was commercial-free.

Much of the distribution used by the two former channels was taken over by Disney XD. This includes the analogue frequency in YouSee's cable network, previously used by Jetix and Hallmark Channel. The channel was also available terrestrially in Denmark from November 1, 2009, via the Boxer platform. Jetix was granted a license to broadcast terrestrially in Sweden in March 2008, but were yet to use it due to transmission disputes.

The channel was shut down on December 31, 2020, simultaneously with the discontinuation of Southeast Asian version of the channel.

Programming
The programming of Disney XD initially included some series that were previously broadcast on Toon Disney and Jetix, but its scope had since then been extended to also include live-action series such as Aaron Stone and feature films. Series carried over from Jetix included Pokémon Battle Dimension, Galactik Football  and Dinosaur King. The first program aired on Disney XD was The Legend of Tarzan. The first film aired was Ratatouille. Series from Disney Channel were also aired.

In the channel's final months of broadcast, its programming consisted primarily of various animated shows from Disney Television Animation such as Phineas and Ferb, Big City Greens, Amphibia, Gravity Falls, Star vs. the Forces of Evil, Big Hero 6: The Series and DuckTales, but also included programs like Spider-Man, EU and UK productions such as Dude, That's My Ghost! and Counterfeit Cat, and selected live-action programs such as K.C. Undercover and Lab Rats.

Films
Whenever films were aired on the channel, they were usually shown on weekends, with a few exceptions.

References

External links
Official website

Pan-Nordic television channels
Children's television networks
Television channel articles with incorrect naming style
Television channels and stations established in 2009
Television channels and stations disestablished in 2020
Defunct television channels in Sweden
Defunct television channels in Denmark
Defunct television channels in Norway
Defunct television channels in Finland